How to Stop a Motor Car is a 1902 British short fantasy comedy film directed by Percy Stow. Cecil M. Hepworth, T.C. Hepworth and Claude Whitten acted in the film. It was released in USA as Policeman and Automobile.

References

External links 
 

1902 films
Films directed by Percy Stow
British silent short films
British black-and-white films
1900s fantasy comedy films
British fantasy comedy films
Silent fantasy comedy films